Tetragonoderus viridicollis is a species of beetle in the family Carabidae. It was described by Pierre François Marie Auguste Dejean in 1829.

References

Beetles described in 1829
viridicollis